Luzia Adão Simão (born February 20, 1992) is an Angolan basketball player. She competed for Angola at the 2011 FIBA Africa Championship. She is 5 ft 5 inches tall.

References

External links
 AfricaBasket Profile

1992 births
Living people
Angolan women's basketball players
G.D. Interclube women's basketball players
Shooting guards
African Games silver medalists for Angola
African Games medalists in basketball
Competitors at the 2011 All-Africa Games